Scott John Ainslie (born 27 December 1968) is a British politician and actor.

He was elected as a Green Party Member of the European Parliament (MEP) for London in the 2019 European parliamentary election. He held
this role until the United Kingdom's withdrawal from the EU. Ainslie is also a councillor representing St Leonard's Ward on the Lambeth Council in London since 2014.

Early life and local political career
Scott John Ainslie was born on 27 December 1968 in Edinburgh. He grew up in a council flat, and has one younger sister. Ainslie graduated from Edinburgh Napier University with an economics degree. After graduating he studied at the drama school Mountview Academy of Theatre Arts on a scholarship. He moved to Streatham in London in 1997. Ainslie has been a Green Party Councillor in the London Borough of Lambeth since 2014, representing the St Leonard's Ward. Since 2018, he has been the Opposition Lead on Standards and Monitoring.

Ainslie is also an actor. His acting roles include appearances in independent horror film The Zombie Diaries (2006), anthology horror film Little Deaths (2011), and musical adaptation Local Hero (2019).

In the 2019 general election, Ainslie was the Green Party candidate for the South London-based seat of Streatham, where he finished in fourth with 4.5% of the vote.

European Parliament
Ainslie stood as a candidate for the Green Party in the 2019 European parliamentary election. He was first on his party's list and was elected as its only MEP in the London constituency. In the European Parliament, Ainslie was a member of the Committee on Transport and Tourism, and was part of the delegation to the ACP–EU Joint Parliamentary Assembly.

References

1968 births
Living people
MEPs for England 2019–2020
Green Party of England and Wales MEPs
Green Party of England and Wales parliamentary candidates
Councillors in the London Borough of Lambeth